The nape is the back of the neck. In technical anatomical/medical terminology, the nape is also called the nucha (from the Medieval Latin rendering of the Arabic). The corresponding adjective is nuchal, as in the term nuchal rigidity for neck stiffness.

In many mammals the nape bears a loose, non-sensitive area of skin, known as the scruff, by which a mother carries her young by her teeth, temporarily immobilizing it during transport.  In the mating of cats the male will grip the female's scruff with his teeth to help immobilize her during the act, a form of pinch-induced behavioral inhibition.

Cultural connotations
The nape of a woman's neck held a strong attraction for many Japanese men (see ).

In Egyptian and Lebanese culture, slapping the nape is considered a gesture of utter humiliation.

References

External links

Human head and neck